Committee on Transportation can refer to:

 United States House Committee on Transportation and Infrastructure
 United States Senate Committee on Commerce, Science, and Transportation
 United States Senate Committee on Transportation Routes to the Seaboard
 National Transportation Safety Committee
 United States Senate Select Committee on the Transportation and Sale of Meat Products
 United States Senate Environment Subcommittee on Transportation and Infrastructure